The 2009–10 Skeleton World Cup was a multi race tournament over a season for skeleton. The season started on 12 November 2009 in Park City, Utah, United States, and ended on 24 January 2010 in Igls, Austria (southeast of Innsbruck). The World Cup was organised by the FIBT who also run world cups and championships in bobsleigh.

Calendar

Results

Men

Women

Standings

Men's

Women's

References

External links
FIBT

Skeleton World Cup
Skeleton World Cup, 2009-10
Skeleton World Cup, 2009-10